Võigemast is an Estonian surname. Notable people with the surname include:
Evelin Võigemast (born 1980), Estonian actress and singer
Jüri Võigemast, Estonian politician
Priit Võigemast (born 1980), Estonian actor

Estonian-language surnames